John Major (born 1943) was Prime Minister of the United Kingdom from 1990 to 1997.

John Major or Sir John Major may also refer to:

Other politicians
John Major (17th-century English MP), English politician and Member of Parliament
Sir John Major, 1st Baronet (1698–1781), English merchant and Member of Parliament

Other people
John Major (cricketer) (1861–1930), English cricketer
John Major (philosopher) (1467–1550), Scottish philosopher and historian
John Major (publisher) (1782–1849), English publisher and bookseller
John Richardson Major (1797–1876), English clergyman and schoolmaster 
John Major (rugby union) (born 1940), New Zealand rugby union player
John C. Major (born 1931), former Justice of the Supreme Court of Canada
Ken Major (John Kenneth Major, 1928–2009), English architect, author and world authority on industrial archaeology
John Major Jenkins (born 1964), American author and populariser of the Maya calendar

See also
Johnny Majors (1935–2020), American football player and coach
John Majhor (1953–2007), Canadian radio and television host
John Mair (disambiguation)
John Mayer (disambiguation)
John Meier (disambiguation)